Voyennes is a commune in the Somme department in Hauts-de-France in northern France.

Geography
Voyennes is situated 30 miles(48 km) west of Amiens, on the D417 road in the valley of the Somme.

Population

See also
Communes of the Somme department

References

Communes of Somme (department)